Argentina competed at the 2008 Summer Olympics held in Beijing, China, from 8 to 24 August 2008. 137 athletes qualified for the Olympic Games in 19 sports.
Manu Ginóbili, basketball player and gold medalist at the 2004 Summer Olympics, was the nation's flag bearer at the opening ceremony.

Medalists

Athletics

Men
Track & road events

Field events

Women
Field events

Basketball

Men's tournament
Argentina's men's basketball team, the defending Olympic champions, qualified for the Olympics by placing second at the FIBA Americas Championship 2007, and marked its fifth Olympic appearance.

The women's team finished fourth at the FIBA Americas Championship for Women 2007, and will be one of twelve teams vying for the final five Olympic spots at the FIBA World Olympic Qualifying Tournament for Women 2008.

Roster

Group play

Quarterfinals

Semifinals

Bronze medal game

Boxing

Argentina had one boxer qualify for the Olympics. Ezequiel Maderna earned a spot in the middleweight competition after coming in second at the 2nd AIBA American Olympic Qualifying Tournament.

Canoeing

Sprint

Qualification Legend: QS = Qualify to semi-final; QF = Qualify directly to final

Cycling

Road

Track
Omnium

Mountain biking

BMX

Equestrian

Show jumping

Fencing

Men

Field hockey

Argentina qualified a team to the women's field hockey tournament. In the group play, they won three matches and drew two, finishing second in the group. This qualified them for the semifinal, which they lost to the Netherlands. In the bronze medal match however, they defeated Germany, winning the bronze medal and finishing third in the tournament.

Women's tournament

Roster

Group play

Semifinal

Bronze medal match

Football

Men's tournament

Roster
Sergio Batista, head coach of the men's football team, announced his final squad for the Olympics on 3 July. Pareja takes the place of Burdisso, whose club did not grant permission.

Group play

Quarterfinals

Semifinals

Gold medal game

Women's tournament

Roster

Group play

Judo

Men

Women

Rowing

Men

Women

Qualification Legend: FA=Final A (medal); FB=Final B (non-medal); FC=Final C (non-medal); FD=Final D (non-medal); FE=Final E (non-medal); FF=Final F (non-medal); SA/B=Semifinals A/B; SC/D=Semifinals C/D; SE/F=Semifinals E/F; QF=Quarterfinals; R=Repechage

Sailing

Men

Women

Open

M = Medal race; EL = Eliminated – did not advance into the medal race; CAN = Race cancelled;

Shooting

Men

Swimming

Men

Women

Table tennis

Taekwondo

Tennis

Men

Women

Volleyball

Beach
The men's beach volleyball team Conde-Baracetti (Martín Conde and Mariano Baracetti) qualified to represent Argentina.

Weightlifting

See also
 Argentina at the 2008 Summer Paralympics

References

Nations at the 2008 Summer Olympics
2008
Olympics